Motti Kakoun (born November 16, 1972, in Tel Aviv) is a retired Israeli footballer mostly known for his time with Hapoel Petah Tikva.

Football career
During his career, Kakoun played mainly for Hapoel Petah Tikva FC. He was appointed team captain at a young age, finishing the 1996–97 season as top league goalscorer, scoring 21 times to help his team finish second, to Beitar Jerusalem FC.

After four more seasons of scoring in double digits for Petah Tikva, twice reaching the 20-goal mark, Kakoun moved abroad, joining Spanish side CP Mérida (second division); however, after only four months, he returned to his country and previous club.

In April 2000, Kakoun reached scored 100th goal in his career, after scoring in a 4–2 derby win over Maccabi Petah Tikva FC. In the 2003 summer, aged 30, he joined second level team Hapoel Kfar Saba FC, playing there for two seasons, and helping it win the league in his second year, with subsequent promotion.

Kakoun moved to Hapoel Petah for a third time in 2005, retiring after two years, with official totals of 156 goals in 379 games.

He returned to play active football in October 2010 for Beitar Petah Tikva and two months later he moved to Hapoel Mahane Yehuda F.C.
At 2012 he returned to Beitar Petah Tikva.

Honours

Team
Israeli Cup: 1991–92
Israeli Second Division: 2004–05

Individual
Israeli League: Top Goalscorer 1996–97

External links
 Stats at HPT
 Stats at ONE.co
 
 

1972 births
Living people
Israeli Jews
Israeli footballers
Association football forwards
Hapoel Petah Tikva F.C. players
Hapoel Kfar Saba F.C. players
Beitar Petah Tikva F.C. players
Hapoel Mahane Yehuda F.C. players
CP Mérida footballers
Israeli expatriate footballers
Expatriate footballers in Spain
Israeli expatriate sportspeople in Spain
Footballers from Petah Tikva
Liga Leumit players
Israeli Premier League players
Israel international footballers